Henry Dewar may refer to:

 Henry Dewar (physician) (1771–1823), Scottish minister, physician and writer
 Henry Dewar, 3rd Baron Forteviot (1906–1993), Scottish businessman
 Henry Dewar (rugby) (1883–1915), New Zealand rugby union forward,